Wayne David Michaels (born 22 January 1959 in Blackpool) is an English stuntman and stunt arranger. He performed the bungee jump in the opening scenes in the James Bond film GoldenEye. The opening 220 m bungee jump, shot at the Verzasca Dam in Switzerland, was voted the best movie stunt of all time as of 2002 and set a record for the highest bungee jump off a fixed structure.

Apart from his work on a number of James Bond films, he has performed stunts on more than 60 British and international film and television projects during the 1980s, the 1990s, and the 2000s.

Select filmography

References

External links

English stunt performers
1959 births
Living people